The 2009–10 Bangladeshi cricket season featured Test series between Bangladesh and India, and between Bangladesh and England. There was also a limited overs international series between Bangladesh and Zimbabwe. Rajshahi Division retained the National Cricket League championship title won the previous season.

Honours
 National Cricket League – Rajshahi Division
 One-Day League – not contested
 Most runs – Jahurul Islam (Rajshahi) 1,008 @ 63.00
 Most wickets – Saqlain Sajib (Rajshahi) 54 @ 19.61

International cricket

India played two Test matches in Bangladesh in January 2010, winning them both. England visited in February/March to play two Tests and three limited overs internationals, winning all five matches. Zimbabwe played five limited overs internationals, but no Tests, in October/November 2009, Bangladesh winning the series 4–1 after losing the opening match.

See also
 History of cricket in Bangladesh

Further reading
 Wisden Cricketers' Almanack 2010

External sources
 Miscellaneous articles re Bangladesh cricket
 CricInfo re Bangladesh
 CricketArchive re tournaments in Bangladesh in 2009–10

2009 in Bangladeshi cricket
2010 in Bangladeshi cricket
Bangladeshi cricket seasons from 2000–01
Domestic cricket competitions in 2009–10